NGC 3554 is an elliptical galaxy in the constellation Ursa Major. It was discovered in December 1827 by John Herschel.

References

External links 
 

3554
Ursa Major (constellation)
Elliptical galaxies
033948